Ridolfo "Aristotele" Fioravanti (c. 1415 or 1420 in Bologna – c. 1486 in Tsardom of Russia) was an Italian Renaissance architect and engineer, active in Muscovy from 1475, where he designed the Dormition Cathedral, Moscow during 1475–1479.

His surname is sometimes given as Fieraventi.  Russian versions of his name are Фиораванти, Фьораванти, Фиеравенти, Фиораванте.

Biography
Little is known about Fioravanti's early years. He was born in Bologna around 1415/1420 to a family of architects and hydraulic engineers.

He became renowned for the very innovative devices he used for the rebuilding of the towers belonging to the noble families of the city. Between 1458 and 1467 he worked in Florence for Cosimo de' Medici the Elder and in Milan, before returning to his native city. There he created the plans for the Palazzo Bentivoglio, but the edifice was not finished (by Giovanni II Bentivoglio) until 1484–1494. In 1467 he worked for king Matthias Corvinus in Hungary.

In 1475 at the invitation of Ivan III he went to Moscow, where he built the magnificent Dormition Cathedral during 1475–1479, taking inspiration from the Dormition Cathedral of Vladimir. This is the work for which he is best remembered.

According to some accounts, he was thrown into prison by Ivan III when he asked to return to Italy, and died in captivity.  According to other accounts, he participated as a military engineer and artillery commander in the campaigns against Novgorod (1477–1478), Kazan (1482) and Tver (1485).

See also

Palazzo del Podestà, Bologna
Palazzo Salaroli
Palazzo Felicini, Bologna

References

1480s deaths
15th-century births
15th-century Italian architects
Russian architects
Italian emigrants to Russia
Renaissance architects
Architects from Bologna